E. Grey Lewis (1940–2005) was an American lawyer who served as General Counsel of the Navy from 1973 to 1977.

Biography 
Lewis was born in 1940 in Atlantic City, New Jersey and educated at the Peddie School where he was student body president. He attended Princeton University, receiving a B.A. in Politics in 1959. While there, he was on the swim team, the rowing team, and was a member of the American Whig–Cliosophic Society. He also participated in the Reserve Officers' Training Corps while in university and upon graduation, joined the United States Army. After completing his army service, he enrolled at the University of Pennsylvania Law School and graduated in 1963.

Assistant United States Attorney
After leaving law school, Lewis became an Assistant United States Attorney for the District of Columbia. He later became an Assistant U.S. Attorney in the United States Department of Justice Civil Division.

General Counsel of the Navy 
In 1973, President of the United States Richard Nixon nominated Lewis as General Counsel of the Navy and, after Senate confirmation, he held this office from August 1, 1973 until April 21, 1977. For his service to the United States Department of the Navy, Lewis was awarded the Navy Distinguished Public Service Award.

Upon leaving the Department of the Navy, Lewis founded a Washington, D.C. law firm, Lewis, Kominers & James. He later became a partner at McDermott Will & Emery.

Death 
Lewis died in 2005 in Alexandria, Virginia.

References

External links
 Obituary from Princeton Alumni Weekly

1940 births
2005 deaths
General Counsels of the United States Navy
Peddie School alumni
People from Atlantic City, New Jersey
Princeton University alumni
University of Pennsylvania Law School alumni
Recipients of the Navy Distinguished Public Service Award
20th-century American lawyers
Nixon administration personnel
Ford administration personnel
Carter administration personnel